Janthina exigua, also known as the dwarf janthina, is a species of small holoplanktonic sea snail, a marine gastropod mollusk in the family Epitoniidae, the violet snails or purple storm snails.

Distribution
This species is pelagic, and occurs around the world in tropical waters, in other words it is circumequatorial.

It has been recorded from:
 The Atlantic Ocean
 British Isles
 European waters
 Madagascar
 Mascarene Plateau
 Mediterranean Sea
 Mozambique
 The Pacific Ocean
 South Africa
 The West Coast of Ireland

Description
The maximum recorded shell length is 15.3 mm.

Habitat
Minimum recorded depth is 0 m. Maximum recorded depth is 0 m.

References

Epitoniidae
Taxa named by Jean-Baptiste Lamarck
Gastropods described in 1816